The World's Hottest Tour was the fourth concert tour by Puerto Rican rapper and singer-songwriter Bad Bunny and his first stadium tour, in support of his fourth studio album Un Verano Sin Ti (2022). DJs Alesso & Diplo were opening acts on select dates. The tour included 43 concert dates in a span of four months.
 
Announced through his social media accounts on January 24, 2022, a few days before he began his tour of El Último Tour del Mundo, the stadium tour will be visiting fourteen countries in the Americas. The tour consists of two legs, the first in the United States and the second in Latin America. Following the announcement of the dates, many shows were quickly sold out and more dates were added.

The World's Hottest Tour was the second highest-grossing tour of 2022, with earnings of over $314 million dollars for the year's 43 shows and around 1.9 million ticket sales. It thus became the highest-grossing tour in history by a Latin American act.

Background 
In early 2021, Bad Bunny announced his third concert tour El Ultimo Tour Del Mundo. The tour broke records in tickets sales and the date were sold out quickly. The tour grossed nearly $117 Million in North American Arenas and was the highest-grossing tour by a Latin artist in Billboard Boxscore history and selling over 575,000 tickets. Also, it was the fastest selling tour since 2018. El Ultimo Tour del Mundo was the top selling album of 2021 in the United States and won Best Urban Music Album at the 22nd Annual Latin Grammy Awards and Best Música Urbana Album at the 64th Grammy Awards.

On January 24, 2022, Bad Bunny announced his upcoming stadium tour and album to be released some time of that year via social media. The album, titled Un Verano Sin Ti, was released in May 2022 and debuted at number one on the Billboard 200, becoming the second all-Spanish language album to do so.

Commercial reception 
Initially, the first announcement of the tour was composed of 29 dates in total, including 17 in the United States in stadiums. Following the announcement, six more shows were added due the high demand of the tickets, including second dates on in Miami, Houston, Los Angeles, San Diego and Las Vegas.
 
For the Chile concerts, 80,000 tickets were sold out in minutes, however, over 1.6 millions of fans were waiting to buy tickets. In Santo Domingo, the first concert was sold out in its first day of sales, and a second date was added. In Peru, 400,000 fans were reported to be waiting online to buy tickets for the second date. In Costa Rica, the tickets were sold out within minutes of being released for sale. In Mexico City only, it is estimated that approximately 4.5 millions of fans queued in order to purchase one of the 115,000 tickets officially available, making it the concert tour with the biggest demand in the history of the country.

The first show at the Camping World Stadium in Orlando, was reported sold out and holds the record as the venue's highest-grossing show. When the tour started, 16 of 21 dates on the first leg in the United States were reported sold out, selling over 725,000 tickets. In August 2022, the tour grossed over US$91 million of dollars. In total, the World's Hottest Tour grossed $232.5 million and sold 944,000 tickets from just 21 shows in the U.S

Ticketmaster México controversy 

During the first show in Mexico City on December 9, 2022, a massive overselling of tickets by the company caused many fans to be denied entry into the concert. Ticktemaster México claimed that an "unprecedented" number of counterfeit tickets were being sold, which led to an overcrowded assistance to crash the operating system and consequently delaying the entrance to the venue. The Office of the Federal Prosecutor for the Consumer (PROFECO, for short) is seeking 100% refunds plus a 20% extra compensation for those affected.

Set list 
This set list is representative of the show on 5 August 2022 in Orlando. It is not representative of all concerts for the duration of the tour.

 "Moscow Mule"
 "Me Porto Bonito"
 "Un Ratito"
 "Efecto"
 "Party"
 "Tarot"
 "La Corriente"
 "Neverita"
 "Ni Bien Ni Mal"
 "La Romana"
 "200 MPH"
 "Estamos Bien"
 "Te Boté (Remix)"
 "I Like It"
 "Si Veo a Tu Mamá"
 "La Difícil"
 "Bichiyal"
 "La Santa"
 "Vete"
 "Yo Perreo Sola"
 "Safaera"
 "Tití Me Preguntó"
 "Dakiti"

 "Yo no soy Celoso"
 "Aguacero"
 "AM (Remix)"
 "Yonaguni"
 "Callaíta"
 "Dos mil 16"
 "Dile"
 "No Te Hagas"
 "Vuelve"
 "Me Mata"
 "No Metes Cabra"
 "Chambea"
 "Soy Peor"
 "Un Verano Sin Ti"
 "Un Coco"
 "La Canción"
 "Andrea"
 "Me Fui de Vacaciones"
 "Otro Atardecer"
 "Ojitos Lindos"
 "El Apagón"
 "Después de la Playa"

Tour dates

Notes

References

 

2022 concert tours
Concert tours of North America
Concert tours of South America
Bad Bunny concert tours